Research software engineering is the use of software engineering practices in research applications. The term was proposed in a research paper in 2010 in response to an empirical survey on tools used for software development in research projects. It started to be used in United Kingdom in 2012, when it was needed to define the type of software development needed in research. This focuses on reproducibility, reusability, and accuracy of data analysis and applications created for research.

Support 

Various type of associations and organisations have been created around this role to support the creation of posts in universities and research institutes. In 2014 a Research Software Engineer Association was created in UK, which attracted 160 members in the first three months. Other countries like the Netherlands, Germany, and the USA followed creating similar communities and there are similar efforts being pursued in Asia, Australia, Canada, New Zealand, the Nordic countries, and Belgium. In January 2021 the International Council of RSE Associations was introduced.

UK counts almost 30 universities and institutes with groups that provide access to software expertise to different areas of research. Additionally, the Engineering and Physical Sciences Research Council created a Research Software Engineer fellowship to promote this role and help the creation of RSE groups across UK, with calls in 2015, 2017, and 2020.

The world first RSE conference took place in UK in September 2016, it was repeated in 2017, 2018 and 2019, and is planned again for 2020. In 2019 the first national RSE conferences in Germany and the Netherlands were held, next editions were planned for 2020 and then cancelled.

The SORSE (A Series of Online Research Software Events) community was established in late‑2020 in response to the COVID-19 pandemic and ran its first online event on 2September 2020.

See also 
 Open Energy Modelling Initiative — relevant here because the bulk of the development occurs in universities

References

Further reading
 The Turing Way
 Research Software Engineering with Python
 Software Carpentry
 Good Research Code Handbook

External links 
 SORSE — A Series of Online Research Software Events — listing of online events tailored for the COVID-19 era
 Research Software Engineers: State of the Nation Report 2017
 Research Software Alliance (ReSA) (international)
 Society of Research Software Engineering (UK)
 US RSE Association

Software engineering